Crosslink Strategy is a conservative lobbying and political consulting firm founded in 2005 by Terry Nelson, a Republican political strategist formerly serving as a senior advisor to Senator John McCain.

In October 2006, Wal-Mart ended its relationship with Crosslink Strategy in response to Nelson's involvement with a Republican campaign ad mocking Democrat Harold Ford Jr. of Tennessee. 

Political consultant Chris LaCivita, most well known for his association with the Swift Boat Vets, is also an employee of Crosslink Strategy.

External links
 Company website
 Nashville Post, "Creator of controversial Ford ad unmasked"
 Austin-American Statesman "McCain adviser linked to anti-Ford ad"
 NY Times "Wal-Mart tries to enlist image help"
 NY Times ""Wal-Mart dismisses adviser who created G.O.P. ad"

Lobbying firms
Political consulting firms